Muktar Ali (born 10 October 1989) is a Bangladeshi cricketer. In January 2016 he was added to Bangladesh's squad for their Twenty20 International (T20I) series against Zimbabwe. He made his T20I debut for Bangladesh against Zimbabwe on 20 January 2016. In November 2019, he was selected to play for the Chattogram Challengers in the 2019–20 Bangladesh Premier League.

References

External links
 

1989 births
Living people
Bangladeshi cricketers
Bangladesh Twenty20 International cricketers
People from Rajshahi District
Barisal Division cricketers
Rajshahi Division cricketers
Sheikh Jamal Dhanmondi Club cricketers
Rangpur Riders cricketers
Prime Doleshwar Sporting Club cricketers
Chittagong Division cricketers
Bangladesh North Zone cricketers
Rajshahi Royals cricketers
Khulna Tigers cricketers